Echoes is the debut full-length studio album by American rock band the Rapture. It was released on September 8, 2003, by DFA and Output in the UK, and on October 21, 2003, by DFA, Vertigo, and Universal in the U.S. It was co-produced by the DFA and the Rapture and recorded at the DFA's own Plantain Recording House studio in New York City.

Background 
The Rapture moved from San Francisco to New York in 1999 and wrote "House of Jealous Lovers" the following year. They met James Murphy and Tim Goldsworthy of DFA Records at one of their first performances in New York. Murphy and Goldworthy took a long time to persuade the band to work together because of a concern that making a dance song would alienate their fans. With the help of the DFA production team, the band released "House of Jealous Lovers" in 2002 and eventually released their first full-length album Echoes. The album secured two Top 40 singles in the UK and also was met with critical acclaim, being awarded Album of the Year by pitchforkmedia.com and runner up in NME only to the White Stripes.

Multi-instrumentalist Gabriel Andruzzi, who is also Safer's cousin, joined the band full-time after the record was completed to help tour. In the wake of the success of "House of Jealous Lovers", The Rapture opened for the Sex Pistols in a football stadium in England, and underwent a large major bidding war eventually signing with Vertigo Records out of the UK and Strummer Records (a Gary Gersh Label) both owned by Universal Music. In January 2004, the Rapture toured with Franz Ferdinand on the NME Awards Tour. Later that year, the band toured on the main stage of the Curiosa Festival alongside Interpol, Mogwai, and The Cure.

Reception 

The album was highly praised by Pitchfork, who hailed the album as the best of 2003, as well as placing the songs "I Need Your Love" at number 323 and "House of Jealous Lovers" at number 16 on their best songs of the 2000s countdown. Resident Advisor ranked the album at number 35 on their list of the best albums of the decade. The song "House of Jealous Lovers" was also ranked sixth on NMEs list of the top 100 tracks of the decade.

Track listing

Personnel 
All personnel adapted from album liner notes.

The Rapture
 Luke Jenner – guitar, percussion, keyboards, vocals
 Gabriel Andruzzi – percussion, saxophone
 Vito Roccoforte – percussion, drums
 Matt Safer – bass guitar, percussion, keyboards, vocals

Additional musicians
 Tyler Brodie – backing vocals 
 Pete Cafarella – keyboards
 Amber Lasciak – backing vocals 
 Mandy Stein – backing vocals 
 Helen Stickler – backing vocals 

Technical personnel
 The DFA – production
 Tim Goldsworthy – programming, multi instruments, engineering, mixing
 James Murphy – programming, multi instruments, engineering, mixing

Charts

Use of songs in other media
 "Echoes" appeared in the 2007 comedy Superbad, and is the theme song for the British drama Misfits.
 "Killing" was featured in the 2005 video game True Crime: New York City.
 "House of Jealous Lovers" was featured as part of the soundtrack for NBA 2K15.

References

2003 debut albums
The Rapture (band) albums
DFA Records albums
Vertigo Records albums
Albums produced by James Murphy (electronic musician)